Phyllonorycter acanthus is a moth of the family Gracillariidae. It is found in scattered riparian habitats in otherwise generally arid, montane regions of the Trans-Mexican Volcanic Belt of Jalisco and Michoacán in Mexico.

The length of the forewings is 2.7–3.6 mm. Adults are on wing in August in one generation.

The larvae mostly feed on Salix bonplandiana mining the leaves of their host plant.

Etymology
The specific name is derived from the Greek acanthus (thorny) in reference to the short, apomorphic spine cluster on the male valva.

References

acanthus
Moths described in 2001
Endemic Lepidoptera of Mexico
Moths of Central America
Fauna of the Trans-Mexican Volcanic Belt